Lewis Stoker (31 March 1910 – 26 May 1979) was an English professional footballer who played as an attacking right half. Born in Wheatley Hill, County Durham, he spent most of his professional career at Birmingham, for whom he played 246 games in all competitions, including 230 in the First Division. He moved on to Nottingham Forest in 1938, made 11 Second Division appearances, and retired during the Second World War. He won three full caps for England between 1932 and 1934, and played once for the Football League representative team. After retiring from football he worked firstly at the BSA factory and then for the Wimbush bakery both in Small Heath[Birmingham] near the StAndrews Football ground where he play most of his football. Lewis died in the city at the age of 69.

His brother Bob also played league football.

References

External links
 

1910 births
1979 deaths
People from Wheatley Hill
Footballers from County Durham
English footballers
England international footballers
Association football wing halves
West Stanley F.C. players
Birmingham City F.C. players
Nottingham Forest F.C. players
English Football League players
English Football League representative players